Zelter is a German language surname, which means "palfrey", a type of riding horse.  The name may refer to:

Angie Zelter (born 1951), British political activist
Carl Friedrich Zelter (1758–1832), German musician

See also
15808 Zelter, a main-belt asteroid
Zelter-Plakette, a German award for choirs
Zelter River, Mongolia and Russia

References

German-language surnames